The Diagnosis: Murder film series  (1992–1993, 2002) is a series of five television films that aired as part of the CBS television series Diagnosis: Murder.

TV films (1992–1993)
The first three Diagnosis: Murder television films were broadcast on CBS between January 5, 1992 and February 13, 1993, before the premiere of television series. The Diagnosis: Murder television series subsequently premiered on CBS on October 29, 1993.

Cast
Dick Van Dyke as Dr. Mark Sloan
Cynthia Gibb as Dr. Amanda Bentley
Stephen Caffrey as Dr. Jack Parker
Barry Van Dyke as Steve Sloan

Films

TV films (2002)

The final episode of the Diagnosis: Murder television series aired on May 11, 2001. Two Diagnosis: Murder television films were broadcast on CBS after this, on February 6 and April 26, 2002.

Cast
Dick Van Dyke as Dr. Mark Sloan
Victoria Rowell as Dr. Amanda Bentley
Charlie Schlatter as Dr. Jesse Travis
Barry Van Dyke as Steve Sloan

Films

References

Diagnosis: Murder seasons